Michel Hamaide (born 1936) is a French politician.

Early life
Michel Hamaide was born on September 3, 1936 in Paris, France.

Career
He served as a member of the fifth legislature of the National Assembly from September 30, 1986 to May 14, 1988, representing Var.

References

1936 births
Living people
Politicians from Paris
Union of Democrats for the Republic politicians
Deputies of the 8th National Assembly of the French Fifth Republic